Coconut the Little Dragon 2: Into the Jungle (also released worldwide as A Dragon's Tale and A Dragon's Adventure in the UK) is a 2018 German musical adventure comedy film directed by Anthony Power and written by Mark Slater and Gabriele Walther (who also acted as producer).

Premise 
In an effort to improve dragon harmony, a summer camp is organised to set sail to an island which is believed to be inhabited by Water Dragons. Dragons Coconut and his best friend, Oscar, sail along, and they smuggle their friend Mathilda, a porcupine, in a box. Once they reach the island, they get shipwrecked and the Water Dragons act hostile, leaving them stranded on a desert island.

References

External links 

Coconut the Little Dragon 2: Into the Jungle at filmportal.de (in German)

2018 films
2018 animated films
German animated films
2010s German films